Clint Auty (born 29 October 1969) is an Australian cricketer. He played two first-class matches for Western Australia in 1990/91.

References

External links
 

1969 births
Living people
Australian cricketers
Western Australia cricketers
Cricketers from Perth, Western Australia